Kada kažeš muzika, na šta tačno misliš, reci mi? (When you say music, what exactly do you mean, tell me?) is the eight studio album by the Serbian alternative rock band Disciplina Kičme, and the first to be released by the latest Belgrade version of the band working under an alternative band name Disciplin A Kitschme. The album was released by the PGP RTS, the heir of the PGP RTB label, under which the band had released several album in the 1980s and early 1990s.

Track listing 
All tracks arranged by Disciplin A Kitschme and written by Koja.

Personnel

The band 
 Koja (Dušan Kojić) — bass, vocals, djembe, drums [snare drum], timpani, music by, lyrics by, mixed by, 
 Buca (Miloš Velimir) — drums, djembe, drums [snare drum], timpani, vocals
 Manja (Manja Đorđević) — vocals

Additional personnel 
 Crni Zub (Dušan Kojić) — artwork by [design], producer
 Vlaca (Vladimir Đorđević) — djembe, drums [snare drum], timpani, vocals [featuring]
 Goran Vukojčić — mastered by
 Danko Đurić — photography
 Stanislav Milojković — photography
 Momma Hell — photography
 Mobil Buca — photography
 Aleksandra Stojanović — recorded by
 Banana (Branislav Petrović) — vocals [featuring]

References 

2007 albums
Serbian-language albums
Disciplina Kičme albums